John William Woolf (November 27, 1869 – February 22, 1950) was an American-born Canadian politician who served in the Legislative Assembly of the Northwest Territories and the Legislative Assembly of Alberta. Born in Utah to polygamous parents, he moved with them to Cardston, Alberta as a young man. There he became a prominent rancher, and was elected in the 1902 Northwest Territories election. When Alberta was created in 1905, he became a member of its first legislative assembly. He resigned that office in 1912 to return to the United States; his son believed that this was because he had taken a second wife and feared prosecution under Canadian polygamy laws. Back in Utah, he pursued a number of business ventures with his son. He died in 1950.

Early life 
Woolf was born November 27, 1869 in Hyde Park, Utah, the son of John Anthony Woolf II, a polygamous Mormon. While he was a young man, his family fled to Canada to avoid anti-polygamy laws and settled near Cardston, Alberta. In June 1888, he married Lucinda Marie Layne, with whom he had one child, William Layne Woolf, in 1890. Lucinda died in 1913. In Canada, Woolf established a  ranch, where he remained until he left the country. From this ranch, he supplied the British with horses during the Second Boer War.

Woolf's home, a rock house rated by his son as one of the two finest in Cardston that replaced a one-room log cabin in 1902, was an active social centre. Among those who spent time there was Quina Austin. Woolf's son believed that his father and Austin were polygamously married around 1902 by John W. Taylor.

Political career 

Woolf was elected to the Legislative Assembly of the Northwest Territories in the 1902 election, defeating Heber Simeon Allen in the district of Cardston. He served in this capacity until 1905, when the new province of Alberta was created out of part of the Northwest Territories. Though in keeping with territorial custom Woolf had served as an independent in the territorial legislature, federally he was a Liberal, and in the debate over whether Alberta's politics should be conducted on an independent basis or along party lines, he was a strong advocate of the latter option.

His side prevailed, and when he ran for the Legislative Assembly of Alberta in the province's inaugural provincial election, it was as a provincial Liberal. He defeated Conservative John F. Parish with the largest majority of any candidate in southern Alberta to win the new provincial district of Cardston. Historian L. G. Thomas attributes this margin to Woolf's having "the Mormon vote in [his] pocket". In the 1909 election, he was re-elected by a reduced margin over Conservative Levi Harker.

During 1910's Alberta and Great Waterways Railway scandal, Woolf remained loyal to Liberal Premier Alexander Cameron Rutherford. He was rumoured to be Rutherford's choice to succeed Public Works Minister William Henry Cushing, whose resignation had precipitated the scandal, but Rutherford's government collapsed before he appointed any successor. When Rutherford was replaced by Arthur Sifton, Woolf supported the new government, even though its approach to the Alberta and Great Waterways question was opposed to Rutherford's, which Woolf had also supported.

In 1910, Woolf bought a house in Salt Lake City in preparation for a return to Utah. His son believed that this was due to the activities of a Protestant minister in Cardston who was investigating and bringing to the attention of the authorities violations of Canada's anti-polygamy laws.  Beginning in late 1911, he was absent from the legislature, and in 1912 he resigned and returned permanently to the United States. The ensuing by-election returned his brother, Martin Woolf, as his replacement.

Later life 
On his return to Utah, Woolf engaged in real estate trading. In 1922, he became, in partnership with his son, the worldwide sales agent for Baldwin Headphones, which had recently gone into receivership. When the company was returned to its original owners following the settlement of its debts, the Woolfs began to sell the radio products of the British Amplion Corporation. They were sued by the Bell Telephone Company for patent infringement; William Layne Woolf recalls that he and his father were surprised to discover that Amplion had stolen Bell's designs. They subsequently founded Recordgraph Recording Corp.

Woolf divorced Quina and married for a third time, to Faith Young, with whom he retired to Los Angeles after selling his share of Recordgraph to his son. Several years later, they moved to Spokane, where Faith's daughters were, before returning to Salt Lake City in 1948 where they lived in an apartment in William's house. Woolf died February 22, 1950, of a heart attack.

Electoral record

Notes

References

External links 

1869 births
1950 deaths
Alberta Liberal Party MLAs
American emigrants to Canada
American Latter Day Saints
Canadian Latter Day Saints
Canadian ranchers
Members of the Legislative Assembly of the Northwest Territories
People from Cache County, Utah
People from Cardston County